William Strickland Row was a set of seven historic rowhouses, four of which survive. The row was  designated a national historic district which is located in the Washington Square West neighborhood of Philadelphia, Pennsylvania. The brick houses were built about 1815, and measure between 16 feet, 6 inches, and 20 feet wide and 35 feet deep.  They are each designed in the typical Philadelphia rowhouse plan of the period with front building, piazza, and back building.  The exhibit Greek Revival style design details.

Noted Philadelphia architect William Strickland (1788–1854) resided at 219 S. 9th Street from 1823 to 1829.

The row was added to the National Register of Historic Places in 1977.

References

Houses on the National Register of Historic Places in Philadelphia
Historic districts in Philadelphia
Greek Revival houses in Pennsylvania
Houses completed in 1815
Washington Square West, Philadelphia
Historic districts on the National Register of Historic Places in Pennsylvania